Thomas Nathaniel Rhoad Jr. (July 16, 1923 – March 14, 2013) was an American farmer and politician.

Early life 
Born in Bamberg County, South Carolina, Rhoad served in the United States Navy during World War II.

Career 
Rhoad was a farmer and worked with the United States Post Office. He also served as a member of the Bamberg County Council. He served in the South Carolina House of Representatives as a Democrat from 1983 to 2007.

During his 24-year-long tenure in the South Carolina House of Representatives, Rhode worked to pass laws on turkey hunting, drug abuse and tax incentives for job creation. Rhoad was also involved in oversight of House personnel and facilities. He was a longtime chairman of the Agricultural, Natural Resources and Environmental Affairs Committees.

Notes

1923 births
2013 deaths
People from Bamberg County, South Carolina
Democratic Party members of the South Carolina House of Representatives
United States Navy personnel of World War II